Music Mountain Junior/Senior High School was a junior and senior high school grades 7 through 12 in Peach Springs, Arizona, established in 2001. It was part of the Peach Springs Unified School District, which currently does not have a high school.

It was a former member of the Arizona Interscholastic Association, staying in its records through 2005. In that year, it enrolled 50 students in grades 9 through 12. Music Mountain Junior/Senior High School closed in 2008.

References

External links
 
 Old AIA records

Schools in Mohave County, Arizona
Former high schools in Arizona
2008 disestablishments in Arizona
Educational institutions disestablished in 2008